Niemotko v. Maryland, 340 U.S. 268 (1951), was a case in which the Supreme Court of the United States held that the city of Havre de Grace, Maryland had violated the free exercise of Niemotko's religion by not issuing a permit for him and his religious group (the Jehovah's Witnesses) to meet in a public park when other religious and civic groups had been given permits for holding their meetings there.

References

External links
 

1951 in United States case law
Christianity in Maryland
Havre de Grace, Maryland
United States Supreme Court cases
United States Supreme Court cases of the Vinson Court
Jehovah's Witnesses litigation in the United States
United States free exercise of religion case law
1951 in Maryland
1951 in religion
Christianity and law in the 20th century